America's Public Television Stations (APTS) is a non-profit membership organization established in 1979 when the Public Broadcasting Service (PBS) board of directors commissioned the public television "system planning project" to consider the most appropriate organization of national service functions for public television for the 1980s. Its major role is representing America's 170 public television licensees in federal legislative, regulatory and related matters in Washington, DC.

References

External links

Public television in the United States
Organizations established in 1979
Television organizations in the United States
Trade associations based in the United States
Non-profit organizations based in Washington, D.C.